The Edith J. Carrier Arboretum is an arboretum and botanical garden on the James Madison University campus, located in Harrisonburg, Virginia, United States in the Shenandoah Valley. Groundbreaking for the arboretum took place April, 1985, under direction of Dr. Norlyn Bodkin,[1] who is credited the first scientific botanical discovery along the Eastern Seaboard of Virginia since the 1940s, Trillium: Shenandoah Wake Robin, presently found at the arboretum[2]. The only arboretum located on the campus of a Virginia state university. Exhibits include a developed trail system through  of mature Oak-Hickory Forrest with two identified century specimens and a species on the U.S. Fish and Wildlife Threatened Species list protected at the arboretum: Betula uber, Round-Leaf Birch.[3]

Its gardens include:

Andrew Wood Memorial Garden (1994) - 92 species including Turk's cap lily, Dutchman's breeches, wild ginger, squirrel corn, native azaleas, laurels and rhododendrons.
April Walk Daffodil Garden (1988) - a variety of daffodils.
Ballard Memorial Planting (1991) - Ginkgo or maidenhair tree, azaleas, rhododendrons, white redbuds, Chinese dogwood and blackhaw tree, Viburnum prunifolium.
Wetlands Garden (1999) - Equisetum, horsetail, and bald cypress.
Drury Planting (1993) - forest pansy redbud, Chinese dogwood, Carolina silverbell, dolchica spirea, Japanese maple, Cherokee sunset dogwood, and dwarf barberry.
Fern Valley - on ravine slopes, ferns including New York fern, hay-scented fern, Christmas fern, ostrich fern, and marginal shield fern.
Glen Dale Azalea Experimental Planting (1996) - hybrid azaleas.
Heath Family Plantings - rhododendrons, azaleas, mountain laurel, and Leucothoe.
Herb Garden (1996)
Larkin Smith Rock Garden (1991) - features 7 of 15-plus endemic species to the shale barren: yellow buckwheat, Virginia white-haired leather flower, ragwort, spike moss, and hairy lipped ferns, with "near endemic" prickly pear cactus and the shining sumac.
Mid-Atlantic Azalea Garden (1996)- azalea natives including pinxter flower, flame azalea, rose azalea, plumleaf azalea, and hybrid crosses.
McDonald Azalea and Rhododendron Garden (1995) - Azaleas and rhododendrons of many varieties.
Norlyn L. Bodkin Oak Hickory Forest (1998) An approximate 20 acre mast producing forest named to honor the arboretum founding director.
Sinclair Garden (1996)- a variety of shrubs and perennials, including Japanese barberry, kousa dogwood, leyland cypress, cherry laurel and rhododendrons.
Viette Perennial Garden (1992) - 18 varieties of daylilies and 8 varieties of Siberian iris, hostas, and Eupatoriums.

There is no conservatory on the grounds. The Frances Plecker Education Center is staffed and open Monday through Friday, generally from 8 a.m. to 4 p.m.

See also 
 List of botanical gardens in the United States

External links 
The Edith Carrier Arboretum Website
James Madison University

Carrier Arboretum
Carrier Arboretum
James Madison University
Geography of Harrisonburg, Virginia
Tourist attractions in Harrisonburg, Virginia